Galloping Wonder Stag (native name Vágtázó Csodaszarvas, 2005–present) is Hungarian music group, associated with world music, psychedelic folk, folk rock and shamanic music labels, continuing Galloping Coroners psychedelic music replacing electronic guitars and drums with acoustic folk instruments.

History 
Galloping Wonder Stag has been founded by Attila Grandpierre, leader of Galloping Coroners (1975–2001) in 2005. The band has about 10–12 members, most of them folk musicians. They use acoustic instruments e.g. tapan, derbuka, violin, bagpipe, folks wind instruments, doublebass, tambura, cister and kobsa.

Style 

Galloping Wonder Stag can be categorized either as a unique subgenre of world music or a derivate it from Galloping Coroners' shaman punk, as an acoustic, folk-instrumented, neotraditional shaman punk that made one step closer to original shamanic music and folk music.  Galloping Wonder Stag use ethnographic materials as manuals on how to reach and communicate ecstatic states. Galloping Wonder Stag plays ancient psychedelic shaman music coming from the oldest roots of Hungarian folk music at Eurasian nomad horse people's tradition.

Galloping Wonder Stag's music is built on band leader Grandpierre's past experiences with Galloping Coroners replacing rock instruments (electric guitars, drum) with acoustic folk instruments. Grandpierre's lyrics praise Hungarian prehistoric culture.

International reputation 
Galloping Wonder Stag is especially famous for its live performance.

Discography 

Pure Source (2006)
 Endless Asia (2008)
 Star Ride (2011)

Members 
Pure Source (2006)

Attila Grandpierre – vocals
Botond Bese – bagpipes
Kálmán Balogh – cimbalom
Félix Benke – drums
Róbert Benkő – double bass
Mátyás Bolya – lute
Tamás Geröly drums
Bernadett Márton – vocals
Krisztina Molnár – violins
Szabolcs Róka – lute
Balázs Szokolay Dongó – winds

Endless Asia (2008)

Attila Grandpierre – vocals
Bernadett M. Gebri – vocals
Csaba Bakos – percussion
Botond Bese – bagpipes
Róbert Benkó – double bass
András Fazekas – drums
András Fábri – cister
Géza Fábri – strings
Krisztina Molnár – violin
Géza Orczi – tapan, ud, saz, buzuki, dzura, tambura, tamburica
Zsolt Vaskó – wind instruments

References

Bibliography 
 Vágtázó Csodaszarvas, Wikipedia in Hungarian
 Attila Grandpierre: Punk As a Rebirth of Shamanist Folk Music 
 "Contemplating the Heavens with VHK's Atilla Grandpierre", by Jordan N. Mamone, at www.vice.com, 2013

External links 
 Official Video Chanel on YouTube
 Official Website

Folk punk groups
Psychedelic folk groups
Folk rock groups
Hungarian world music groups
Musical groups established in 2005
2005 establishments in Hungary